The 1952 All-Southern Conference football team consists of American football players chosen by the United Press (UP) for the All-Southern Conference football team for the 1952 college football season.

All-Southern Conference selections

Backs
 Jack Scarbath, Maryland (UP-1)
 Ed Mioduszewski, William & Mary (UP-1)
 Worth Lutz, Duke (UP-1)
 John Gramling, South Carolina (UP-1)

Ends
 Jack Lewis, Wake Forest (UP-1)
 Paul Bischoff, West Virginia (UP-1)

Tackles
 Ed Meadows, Duke (UP-1)
 Don Earley, South Carolina (UP-1)

Guards
 Bob Burrows, Duke (UP-1)
 Bill Malezky, Maryland (UP-1)

Centers
 Leon Cunningham, South Carolina (AP-1)

Key

UP = United Press

See also
1952 College Football All-America Team

References

All-Southern Conference football team
All-Southern Conference football teams